Hillsboro High School is a public high school located in the city of Hillsboro, Texas, USA and classified as a 3A school by the UIL.  It is a part of the Hillsboro Independent School District located in central Hill County.   In 2015, the school was rated "Met Standard" by the Texas Education Agency.

Athletics
The Hillsboro Eagles compete in these sports - 

Volleyball, Cross Country, Football, Basketball, Powerlifting, Golf, Tennis, Track, Baseball & Softball

State Titles
Boys Track 
1918(1A)

Notable alumni
 Bob Bullock, 38th Lieutenant Governor of Texas
 James "Red" Duke, professor and surgeon at University of Texas Health Science Center at Houston and Memorial Hermann–Texas Medical Center
 Mike Harris, NBA and CBA player
 Wood B. Kyle, USMC major general
 Billy Patterson, NFL player
 Derel Walker, CFL player

References

External links

Public high schools in Texas
Schools in Hill County, Texas